Tomasz Stankiewicz (28 December 1902 – 21 June 1940) was a Polish track cyclist who competed in the 1924 Summer Olympics. He was born in Warsaw and died in Palmiry, executed by Nazis.

In 1924 he won the silver as member of the Polish team in the team pursuit.

References

External links
 profile 

1902 births
1940 deaths
Polish male cyclists
Polish track cyclists
Olympic cyclists of Poland
Cyclists at the 1924 Summer Olympics
Olympic silver medalists for Poland
Polish people executed by Nazi Germany
Cyclists from Warsaw
Olympic medalists in cycling
Medalists at the 1924 Summer Olympics
Polish civilians killed in World War II